Boryspil Raion (translit.: Boryspil's'kyi raion) is an administrative raion (district) in east-central Kyiv Oblast of Ukraine. Its administrative center is the city of Boryspil. Population: .

On 18 July 2020, as part of the administrative reform of Ukraine, the number of raions of Kyiv Oblast was reduced to seven, and the area of Boryspil Raion was significantly expanded. Two abolished raions, Pereiaslav-Khmelnytskyi and Yahotyn Raions, as well as the cities of Boryspil and Pereiaslav, which were previously incorporated as cities of oblast significance and did not belong to the raion, were merged into Boryspil Raion. The January 2020 estimate of the raion population was

Geography
The Boryspil raion is located in the east-central area of the Kyiv Oblast, and has a total area of 146 km2.

On the raion's southern border flows the Dnieper River (Dnipro). Near the river, the raion's lowest elevation points are located. Other rivers that flow through the raion include: the left tributaries of the Dnieper: Pavlivka, Mlen, Ikva, and the right tributaries of the Trubizh River: Bochechky, Karan', Vohnyscha, Krasylivka, Al'ta, and Il'tytsia. All of the raion's rivers flow through the low-elevation territory, making all of the rivers flow more slowly. The rivers take their sources from winter snowfalls and seasonal rains. On the southernmost border of the raion is the Kaniv Reservoir, which provides electric supply to nearby areas.

Forests cover about 150 km2 of the raion's 146 km2 area.

Demographics
The Boryspil raion's total population is 53,483, which includes 23,400 males, and 30,080 females. The number of pensioners totals 16,300, about 33.6% of the total population of the raion. The density of the raion's population is 364 p/km2.

The national ethnic composition is: Ukrainians (95.2 %), Russians (3.8 %), Belarusians (0.3 %) and Moldovans (0.1 %).

Culture
Within the Boryspil raion operates a musical school for children (in the village of Schastlyve), a school of art (in the village of Velyka Oleksandrivka) Also, a couple of educational schools operate on the territory of the raion:

 Institute of Cloning and Genetics of Animals (Ukrainian Academy of Agriculture);
 Central science-laboratory for experiments with water and ground soil (Institute of Hydrotechno, UAAN).

A festival (Argo and Kyiv's fall), is held two times a year within the village of Chubynske. Within the village of Revne, is a reserved retirement village for veterans of wars. In addition, living quarters are reserved for children of homeless children and children of poor families in the villages of Revne, Abaievykh, and Stare.

Subdivisions

Current
After the reform in July 2020, the raion consisted of 11 hromadas:
 Boryspil urban hromada, with the administration in the city of Boryspil, transferred from the city of oblast significance of Boryspil;
 Divychky rural hromada with the administration in the selo of Divychky, transferred from Pereiaslav-Khmelnyitskyi Raion; 
 Hora rural hromada with the administration in the selo of Hora, retained from Boryspil Raion;
 Pereiaslav urban hromada, with the administration in the city of Pereiaslav, transferred from the city of oblast significance of Pereiaslav; 
 Prystolychna rural hromada with the administration in the selo of Shchaslyve, retained from Boryspil Raion;
 Studenyky  rural hromada with the administration in the selo of Studenyky, transferred from Pereiaslav-Khmelnyitskyi Raion; 
 Tashan rural hromada with the administration in the selo of Tashan, transferred from Pereiaslav-Khmelnyitskyi Raion; 
 Tsybli rural hromada with the administration in the selo of Tsybli, transferred from Pereiaslav-Khmelnyitskyi Raion; 
 Voronkiv rural hromada with the administration in the selo of Voronkiv, retained from Boryspil Raion;
 Yahotyn urban hromada with the administration in the city of Yahotyn, transferred from Yahotyn Raion;
 Zolochiv rural hromada with the administration in the selo of Hnidyn, retained from Boryspil Raion.

Before 2020

Before the 2020 reform, the raion consisted of four hromadas, 
 Hora rural hromada with the administration in Hora;
 Prystolychna rural hromada with the administration in Shchaslyve;
 Voronkiv rural hromada with the administration in Voronkiv;
 Zolochiv rural hromada with the administration in Hnidyn.

Previously, it consisted of 20 rural councils that contained 43 villages.

See also
 Administrative divisions of Kyiv Oblast
 Boryspil Airport

References

External links

 kyiv-obl.gov.ua - Information about the Boryspil raion 
 Verkhovna Rada website - Administrative divisions of the Boryspil raion 

 
Raions of Kyiv Oblast
Kyiv metropolitan area
1923 establishments in Ukraine